Aubry Township is one of seven townships in Johnson County, Kansas, USA.  As of the 2000 census, its population was 5,440.

Aubry Township was organized in 1858.

Geography
According to the United States Census Bureau, Aubry Township covers an area of 48.85 square miles (126.52 square kilometers); of this, 48.7 square miles (126.13 square kilometers, 99.69 percent) is land and 0.15 square miles (0.4 square kilometers, 0.32 percent) is water.

The south edge of the city of Overland Park is within this township geographically but is a separate entity.

Unincorporated towns
 Aubry at 
 Stilwell at 
(This list is based on USGS data and may include former settlements.)

Adjacent townships
 Oxford Township (north)
 Wea Township, Miami County (south)
 Ten Mile Township, Miami County (southwest)
 Spring Hill Township (west)
 Olathe Township (northwest)

Cemeteries
The township contains these two cemeteries: Aubry and Woodland.

Major highways
  U.S. Route 69

Airports and landing strips
 Hillside Airport
 Mission Road Landing Strip

School districts
 Blue Valley Unified School District 229
 Spring Hill Unified School District 230

Political districts
 Kansas's 3rd congressional district
 State House District 27
 State Senate District 37

References
 United States Census Bureau 2007 TIGER/Line Shapefiles

 United States National Atlas

External links
 US-Counties.com
 City-Data.com

Townships in Johnson County, Kansas
Townships in Kansas